St. Louis County is the name of two counties in the United States:

St. Louis County, Missouri
St. Louis County, Minnesota